Aleksey Valeryevich Rogov (born 8 May 1991) is a Russian football player.

Club career
He made his debut in the Russian Football National League for FC Tekstilshchik Ivanovo on 6 March 2022 in a game against FC Alania Vladikavkaz.

References

External links
 
 
 
 Profile by Russian Football National League

1991 births
Footballers from Moscow
Living people
Russian footballers
Association football forwards
FC Lokomotiv Moscow players
FC Moscow players
FC Olimp-Dolgoprudny players
FC Tekstilshchik Ivanovo players
Russian Second League players
Russian First League players